John Morley (born May 6, 1970) is a Republican politician from Vermont. He served in the  
Vermont House of Representatives, representing the Orleans-Caledonia-1 Representative District.

Biography
Morley was born in Newport, Vermont and graduated from the University of Vermont with a Bachelor of Science in 1993. He was Chairman of the Vermont Public Power Supply Authority, and has been the Village Manager of Orleans, Vermont since 1993.

He served as a Representative in the Vermont House of Representatives from 2004 to 2010. While in the State House, Morley served on the Appropriations and Commerce Committees. In September 2012, Morley was elected President of the Northeastern Vermont Development Association.

Morley and his wife Jodi have two children. They live in Orleans, Vermont.

References

External links 
 
 Project Vote Smart: John Morley III's Biography
 VermontBiz.com: John Morley elected board president at NVDA annual meeting

1970 births
Living people
Republican Party members of the Vermont House of Representatives
People from Newport (city), Vermont